WEMG (1310 AM, "Mega 105.7") is a commercial AM radio station licensed to serve Camden, New Jersey. The station is owned by Mega-Philadelphia LLC and airs a Spanish hits format.

History
The station was originally owned by the City of Camden and in 1924 was assigned the WCAM call sign. In the 1940s the station shared time on its frequency with WTNJ in Trenton and WCAP in Asbury Park; an agreement implemented in 1949 ended the time-share and allowed WCAM to become a full-time station, although with lower power than it had previously used.

WCAM broadcast a variety of formats over the years. From September 1965 to April 1966 it was the Philadelphia-area affiliate of the NBC Radio Network, and it was the radio flagship of the Philadelphia Flyers in the team's second season, 1968–69. The station was not consistently profitable, and the city began attempting to sell it in the mid-1960s. After a few false starts, a deal was finally made in the late 1970s and the station was sold to Philadelphia cable TV operator Wade Communications. Wade changed the call sign to WSSJ in 1980, and a few years later sold the station to a group led by a local businessman and a station employee. In 1998 they sold WSSJ for $2 million to Spanish-language broadcaster Alfredo Alonso, owner of Mega Communications, which at the time operated WEMG on 900 kilohertz in Philadelphia. In 2001 Mega sold the license for 900 and moved the WEMG call sign to the Camden-licensed station, then sold the operation to current owner Davidson Media in 2005.

Davidson originally operated WEMG as primarily a brokered radio station, offering time slots for sale to persons or businesses who then broadcast programs on a variety of different topics or presented music programs of their own design. For the past several years, WEMG has transitioned to more station-originated programming. Today, several brokered programs remain on the air; most present music and are heard mainly on weekends. The station also carries Spanish language play-by-play of the NFL's Philadelphia Eagles.

Mega's 2014 weekday announcer lineup includes El Show de Luis Jimenez (a nationally syndicated program) in mornings, Jorge "El Chico Malo" Melendez (WEMG's program director) in middays, "Rudy Rudisimo" Garcia in afternoons, and DJ Jay Serrano in evenings.

WEMG is active in the Philadelphia and South Jersey Latino communities. Mega is supporting sponsor of numerous neighborhood events including La Parada San Juan Bautista in Camden and Concilio's Hispanic Fiesta in Philadelphia, and is a partner with other leading Hispanic organizations in their activities.

Translators
Mega programming is broadcast on the following translators:

Mega programming is also available via a simulcast on the HD2 subchannel of 97.3 WENJ.

References

External links

 
 
 
 

EMG
EMG
Radio stations established in 1924
Mass media in Camden, New Jersey
1924 establishments in New Jersey